Youngsville is an unincorporated community in Adams County, in the U.S. state of Ohio.

History
Youngsville had its start in 1840 when David Young opened a store there. A post office called Youngsville was established in 1848, and remained in operation until 1905.

References

Unincorporated communities in Adams County, Ohio
1840 establishments in Ohio
Populated places established in 1840
Unincorporated communities in Ohio